Richard Griffiths (1947–2013) was an English actor.

Richard Griffiths may also refer to:

Richard Griffiths (industrialist) (1756–1826), Welsh industrial pioneer
Richard Griffiths (unionist) (1827–1891), Welsh-born American labor union leader
Richard Griffiths (historian) (born 1948), English historian
Rick Griffiths (1948–2010), Australian Aboriginal activist and representative
Dick Griffiths, Irish footballer

See also
Richard Griffith (disambiguation)